Iniyoru Janmam Tharu is a 1972 Indian Malayalam film, directed by K. Vijayan. The film stars Madhu, Jayabharathi, Adoor Bhasi, C. A. Balan and Paravoor Bharathan in the lead roles. The film was produced by Chinna Ramalingam. The film had musical score by M. B. Sreenivasan.

Cast
Madhu
Jayabharathi
Adoor Bhasi
C. A. Balan
Paravoor Bharathan
Philomina
Santha Devi
Veeran

Soundtrack
The music was composed by M. B. Sreenivasan and the lyrics were written by Vayalar Ramavarma.

References

External links
 

1972 films
1970s Malayalam-language films
Films directed by K. Vijayan